Divers is the fourth studio album by American musician Joanna Newsom, released on October 23, 2015 via Drag City.

The album was revealed on August 10, 2015, along with its first song, "Sapokanikan", which was released digitally as the first single. The cover art, album packaging, and music video for the album's title track feature the work of artist Kim Keever. The music video was directed by Paul Thomas Anderson with whom Newsom worked for the film Inherent Vice.

Speaking about the album's creative process in an interview with Entertainment Weekly, she said "I ... spent a year or two on the instrumental arrangements and overdubs. I wanted the character and colors of the instrumentation to shift definitively, from song to song, which entailed a wide pool of collaborators and a lengthy collaborative process with each person." She further described the process of making the album as "probably the most fun I’ve had making a record". Entertainment Weekly also reported Newsom "as using an arsenal of nearly a dozen keyboards and synths including clavichords, Mellotrons and Marxophones" for the album while members of the City of Prague Philharmonic Orchestra feature as players on the album.

Critical reception

Divers received widespread critical acclaim, achieving an aggregate score of 88 on Metacritic based upon 33 reviews. It receives a similarly high score of 8.6 on AnyDecentMusic?, with the collated scores of thirty-five reviews. Critics praised the complexity of Newsom's lyrics and arrangements, while noting that the record is more accessible and compact than previous releases. In a positive review for Exclaim!, Stephen Carlick wrote that "Divers feels like the culmination of all of Newsom's incredible work over the past decade. It's the sound of an artist operating at the peak of her powers, employing all her greatest strengths at once to create an assured, moving work that corroborates what Have One On Me already suggested: that Joanna Newsom is one of the finest songwriters of this generation." Another positive review, by Ben Ratliff in The New York Times, described, "Almost nothing in the way this music is composed, produced (by Ms. Newsom and Noah Georgeson) or recorded (by Steve Albini and Mr. Georgeson) seems incidental or accidental. You almost want to hold the whole thing still, flatten it out and study it."

Pitchfork awarded the album the 'Best New Music' tag, and stated that "on her fourth album, Divers, Joanna Newsom comes down in size if not scope". They go on to describe the record as "a love letter in the form of a reckoning with death, Divers deals with making tangible the huge mass of impending doom about the loss of love. You know, the small stuff. It's a gorgeous record, full of her usual harp wilyness and baroque rhythms".

James Skinner, writing for Drowned in Sound, concluded by saying that the record is, "Conveyed with sincerity, warmth and the musicianship and love of language and storytelling that sets - has always set - Joanna Newsom apart, Divers is a colossal achievement." Skinner awarded the album full marks. The Skinny also gave the record a perfect score, saying that after listening to the record, "It'll be hard not to conclude that this is surely one of the albums of the year".

Accolades

Commercial performance
Newsom achieved her first No. 1 on Billboards Alternative Albums chart with the album, which sold 14,000 units in its first week. It marked Newsom's best career sales week, topping the first week sales of 2006's Ys, which sold 9,000. Divers also debuted at No. 2 on the Vinyl Albums chart, with 3,000 LPs sold.

Track listing
The track listing was officially announced by Drag City on August 10, 2015.

All songs written by Joanna Newsom, except "Same Old Man" (traditional).

Personnel

Performance

 Joanna Newsom – harp, piano, Roland Juno-106, Minimoog, Schiedmayer celesta, Marxophone, Mellotron (MK II and M400), Wurlitzer electric piano, Neupert clavichord, Fender Rhodes piano with bass, Baldwin electric harpsichord, Baldwin Discoverer electronic organ, Estey pump organ, guitaret, and vocals
 Dan Cantrell – Hammond organ, piano accordion, Andes recorder-keyboard, musical saw
 Ryan Francesconi – electric guitar, electric bass, bouzouki, bağlama
 Kevin Barker – electric guitar, banjo
 Judith Linsenberg – alto, tenor and bass recorder
 Logan Coale – double bass 
 David Nelson – trombone
 Andy Strain – trombone
 Ben Russell – violin
 Rob Moose – violin
 Matthew Slemela – violin
 Nadia Sirota – viola
 Hideaki Adomori – clarinet, bass clarinet
 James Smith – English horn
 Peter Newsom – drums
 Neal Morgan – drums

Production
 Joanna Newsom – producer, songwriter, harp, piano, keyboard and vocal arrangements
 Steve Albini – engineer
 Ryan Francesconi – arrangements, conductor
 Noah Georgeson – engineer, producer and mixing
 John Golden – mastering
 Kim Keever – cover art
 Samur Khouja – engineer
 Annabel Mehran – photographer
 Paul Thomas Anderson – photographer
 Nico Muhly – orchestral arrangements on "Anecdotes"
 David Longstreth – orchestral arrangements on "Time, As a Symptom"
 Ryan Francesconi – additional arrangements
 Dan Cantrell – additional arrangements
 Noah Georgeson – additional arrangements
 Kevin Barker – additional arrangements
 Neal Morgan – drum and percussion arrangements
 Peter Newsom – drum and percussion arrangements
 Dan Osborn – layout designer
 Justin Rice – engineer
 Sadaharu Yagi – engineer

Charts

References

2015 albums
Drag City (record label) albums
Joanna Newsom albums
Albums recorded at Electro-Vox Recording Studios